NSPC is an abbreviation that can refer to:

 National School of Public Policy in Pakistan
 National Schools Press Conference in the Philippines
 New school of psychotherapy and counseling in the United Kingdom
 National-Socialist Party of Canada in Canada
 Provincial Court of Nova Scotia
 Neural Stem/Progenitor Cells